Ariniș River may refer to:

 Ariniș, a tributary of the Izvorul Alb in Bacău County
 Ariniș River (Tazlău)

Others 
 Arinișul Mare River

See also 
 Ariniș, a commune in Maramureș County, Romania